Betty Price was the executive director of the Oklahoma Arts Council from 1983 until her retirement in 2007. During her time as executive director, Price worked with eight different Oklahoma governors. Price served for many years as an arts advisor to state, non-profit organizations and a number of boards. She was inducted into the Oklahoma Women's Hall of Fame in 1985 among many other awards and recognitions.

Early life
Betty Price was born in Booneville, Arkansas and lived with her family in Shawnee, Oklahoma and El Paso, Texas before they moved to Muskogee, Oklahoma, where she began attending school. During her grade school years, Price enjoyed the fine arts and journalism. In the second grade, Price learned how to play the piano and later became involved with the school newspaper, an activity that would follow her into her college years.

Education
After graduating from high school, Price attended Northeastern State University where she received a scholarship and was the editor of the college newspaper. She graduated from NSU with a degree in music education. While at Northeastern State University, Price met her husband, Norris. The two dated through their sophomore year and married after he returned from Japan after serving a year in the National Guard.

Early career
Upon graduating with her degree, Price upskilled her first year in Norman, Oklahoma, teaching at two separate schools every day. Her second year, Price coached second grade in Del City, Oklahoma and her husband, Norris, began his career in real estate. After two years of teaching, Price was pregnant with her first child and then started teaching piano lessons while she raised her new born. When a neighborhood friend of the family, John L. Garrett, was elected to the Oklahoma Senate in 1964, Price went to work for him as a typist. As she began to bring artwork into the office, other senators came to her asking for art for their office. This led to a friendship with former governor George Nigh, lieutenant-governor at the time, which allowed her to work part-time for him.

Oklahoma Arts Council
Price began to work as a secretary for lieutenant-governor George Nigh and also as an artist. Price painted all of the state emblems along with other projects as directed by Nigh. During legislative sessions, Price would take a week off and participate in the Festival of the Arts in Oklahoma City. At this festival, Price met the director of the Oklahoma Arts Council (then called the Oklahoma Arts and Humanities Council), and he asked her to work for them full-time. In 1974, Price joined the Oklahoma Arts Council as the public information director and State Capitol liaison. Price began contracting artists to bring more artwork into the Capitol. In 1983, Price became the executive director for the Oklahoma Arts Council after the five men that were directors retired.

As the director, Price's main goal was to increase awareness and funding for the arts all over the state of Oklahoma. Price helped to expand the position with her interest in the visual arts and the Capitol. She was able to get legislation written to establish a Capitol Preservation Commission. The Oklahoma Arts Council was the first state agency to go online with the coming of the technological age due to Price's staff, which allowed the public a greater chance to get involved with the arts. Price was made responsible for commissioning artwork and murals that improved the bare Capitol walls. Price aided in the commissioning of Mike Larsen to paint "Flight of the Spirit," a mural painted on the rotunda that honored all five of Oklahoma's American Indian world-class ballerinas. Five years later, the ballerinas were brought back to the Capitol to be named Cultural Treasures, an award developed during Price's time as Director of the Arts Council. Galleries were also created in the State Capitol during Price's time in the council. A gallery on the first floor is reserved for changing exhibits, another for photography, and in 2008 a gallery for the State Art Collection has named the Betty Price gallery in her honor.

Retirement
Even after retirement from the Arts Council, Price remains busy supporting the arts. She is involved with the Red Earth Advisory Board as well as the Indian Museum and Cultural Center Board. Aside from her involvement with the arts, Price spends time with her husband Norris and their children and grandchildren.

Awards and recognition
Throughout her lengthy career, Price has been honored with numerous awards and recognition, including:
Oklahoma Women’s Hall of Fame inductee (1985)  
Red Earth Ambassador of the Year (2006)
State Arts Agency Director of the Year by the National Assembly of State Art Agencies in Washington, D.C. (2000)
Newsmaker Award from the Tulsa chapter of the Association of Women in Communications (2004)
Named Women of Influence by Oklahoma magazine
Named Honored One at the Oklahoma Indian Sovereignty Symposium (1999)
Chickasaw Nation Governor's Award (1999)
Centennial Woman of Distinction from the Sigma Sigma Sigma sorority (1998)
National Alumna Award from the Sigma Sigma Sigma Sorority
Northeastern State University Homecoming Honoree (2009)
Betty Price Scholarship named at Northeastern State University
"Life, Legacy and Light" Award by the Oklahoma Israel Exchange (2010)
Del City Hall of Fame (1983)

References

External links
Oklahoma Women's Hall of Fame Oral History Project -- OSU Library
"Arts Elevate City, State" -- The Oklahoman
"Celebrating arts community" -- The Oklahoman

Living people
People from Shawnee, Oklahoma
People from Muskogee, Oklahoma
People from Booneville, Arkansas
People from El Paso, Texas
Year of birth missing (living people)